Cassidy Doneff (born July 14, 1986) is a professional Canadian football wide receiver most recently for the Winnipeg Blue Bombers of the Canadian Football League. He was drafted by the Hamilton Tiger-Cats in the sixth round of the 2009 CFL Draft. He played college football for the Washburn Ichabods. In 2008, Doneff won the Wally Buono Award for the most outstanding junior football player.

References

External links
Just Sports Stats

1986 births
Living people
Canadian football wide receivers
Washburn Ichabods football players
Hamilton Tiger-Cats players
Players of Canadian football from Alberta
Winnipeg Blue Bombers players
People from Cochrane, Alberta